Oleksandr Oleksandrovych Kovalenko (24 March 1976 – 21 December 2010) was a Ukrainian  professional footballer and later a football referee.

Career
Kovalenko made his professional debut in the Ukrainian Second League in 1993 for FC Metalurh Kostyantynivka. After his initial professional stint he played for different Ukrainian Premier League clubs.

Kovalenko played four matches for the Ukraine national under-21 football team in 1997.

After retiring as a footballer, Kovalenko worked as a football referee.

Death
On 21 December 2010, Kovalenko committed suicide by jumping from his apartment.

References

External links
 

1976 births
2010 deaths
People from Bakhmut
Ukrainian footballers
Association football midfielders
Ukraine under-21 international footballers
FC Metalurh Kostiantynivka players
FC Shakhtar Makiivka players
FC Shakhtar Donetsk players
FC Shakhtar-2 Donetsk players
FC Dnipro players
FC Dnipro-2 Dnipropetrovsk players
FC Metalurh Donetsk players
FC Metalurh-2 Donetsk players
FC Kryvbas Kryvyi Rih players
FC Kryvbas-2 Kryvyi Rih players
Ukrainian Premier League players
Ukrainian First League players
Ukrainian Second League players
Ukrainian football referees
Suicides by jumping in Ukraine
2010 suicides
Sportspeople from Donetsk Oblast